Patrick Edson Bonifácio (born 4 January 1994), commonly known as Patrick Bonifácio or Patrick Boni, is a Brazilian footballer who currently plays as a forward for Da Nang.

Career statistics

Club

Notes

References

1994 births
Living people
Brazilian footballers
Brazilian expatriate footballers
Association football forwards
Grêmio Osasco Audax Esporte Clube players
Tombense Futebol Clube players
Mirassol Futebol Clube players
Palmas Futebol e Regatas players
Batatais Futebol Clube players
SHB Da Nang FC players
V.League 1 players
Brazilian expatriate sportspeople in Vietnam
Expatriate footballers in Vietnam